Laira  – previously recorded as Lare(1591),  Lary poynte (1638), the Leerie (1643), and the Lairy (1802) – was originally the name given to that part of the estuary of the River Plym from the Cattewater up to Marsh Mills in Plymouth, Devon, England. The name may derive from a Brythonic word corresponding to the Welsh llaeru, meaning 'to ebb'.

The A379 road and the disused Plymouth to Yealmpton railway line cross the estuary just above the Plymouth suburb of Cattedown by two bridges both known as Laira Bridge.

The name Laira now also refers to the area of Plymouth surrounding the Laira Traction Maintenance Depot. Much of the housing here was built around 1900 for employees of the depot. There is a memorial plaque to the men of Laira who died in the Great War along Old Laira Road. Also situated on Old Laira Road is the old Police / Fire Station which is currently used as a library. Laira Green Primary school is situated in the area, as well as a disused United Reformed Church.

Until the beginning of the 19th century, Old Laira Road had constituted the northern shore of Lipson Lake (or Bay), an extensive tidal inlet on the western side of the estuary. This area – on which the railway depot and Lipson Co-operative Academy now stand – was reclaimed from the estuary and drained, together with Tothill Bay on the south side of higher ground at Mount Gould, upon the completion in 1802 of an embankment along the whole western shore of the Laira. A new road, laid along this embankment shortly afterwards, from Laira Green to Prince Rock, soon became the main highway into Plymouth from Plympton, Exeter, and beyond, avoiding the often steep and narrow way via Old Laira Road and Lipson – even though the new route was to remain a toll road until 1924.

References

Suburbs of Plymouth, Devon